Ed Madden is a poet, activist, and Director of Women's and Gender Studies at the University of South Carolina in the USA.  He grew up in Newport, Arkansas, got his B.A. from nearby Harding University, and received his Ph.D. in literature from the University of Texas, Austin.

Professor and poet
Madden is an associate professor of English.  He has written several critical articles on modern British and Irish poetry and has completed a book on representations of Tiresian liminality in modernist poetry (Tiresian Poetics: Modernism, Sexuality, Voice, 1888-2001 from Fairleigh Dickinson University Press).  He co-edited (with Marti Lee) Irish Studies: Geographies and Genders, also co-edited an anthology of essays and poems on male experience, The Emergence of Man into the 21st Century, and wrote "An Open Letter to My Christian Friends," which appears in various textbooks, including Everything's an Argument. Madded has undertaken extensive research on the Irish writer Colm Ó Clúbhán and hosted a Boston College Ireland symposium on Ó Clúbhán in 2017.

In addition to his literary criticism, he also publishes on issues involving sexuality and spirituality.  He has published "Gospels of Inversion: Literature, Scripture, Sexology" in a collection of essays entitled Divine Aporia: Postmodern Conversation About the Other (edited by John C. Hawley).  Another intervention in the intersection of religion, literature, and sex came in the essay "'The Well of Loneliness', or the Gospel According to Radclyffe Hall," published in Reclaiming the Sacred: The Bible in Gay and Lesbian Culture (edited by Raymond-Jean Frontain).

Madden has been a South Carolina Academy of Authors fellow in poetry twice.  He has been writer in residence at the Riverbanks Botanical Gardens in Columbia, South Carolina, and he also worked as writer in residence at Fort Moultrie in Charleston, South Carolina, as part of the state's African-American Heritage Corridor project.  He also works with the South Carolina Poetry Initiative and has been named a 2006 Artist-in-Residence by the South Carolina State Parks.

Madden won not only the single-poem contest sponsored by The State newspaper (Columbia, South Carolina) and the South Carolina Poetry Initiative (with "Prodigal: Variations"), but he has also won the South Carolina Poetry Book Prize, with Signals, which was published by the University of South Carolina Press.  More recently, Madden was selected as one of the top 50 New Poets by Meridian Magazine (which is published by the University of Virginia Press) for his poem, "Sacrifice," which was included in the Best New Poets of 2007 anthology .

His poetry collection Prodigal: Variations appeared in 2011.  His chapbooks include My Father's House (Seven Kitchens Press, 2013), runner-up for the 2011 Robin Becker Chapbook Prize ; So they can sing (Seven kitchens Press, 2017, Robin Becker Series); and Sebastian (Seven Kitchens Press, 2021, ReBound Series). His latest books of poetry are Nest (Salmon Press, 2014) and Ark (Sibling Rivalry Press, 2016).

In January 2015, Madden was named Columbia, SC's first Poet Laureate.

Activist
Madden has been Secretary, Vice President, and President of the South Carolina Gay and Lesbian Pride Movement.  He has written numerous editorials advocating gay liberation in local and national newspapers.  He is also the executive producer of Rainbow Radio: The REAL Gay Agenda, a South Carolina-based, gay-themed radio talk show that is broadcast Sundays at 10 a.m. in Columbia, South Carolina on Air America, WOIC-AM 1230.  This project culminated in the book Out Loud: The Best of Rainbow Radio, a collection and joint project with fellow activist Candace Chellew-Hodge.  This book was chosen by the University of South Carolina's Upstate campus as a common reader for their first-year experience.  This led the South Carolina House of Representatives to cut funds to that school in what some called an act of censorship.

His life partner is Mr. Bert Easter, President of the South Carolina Gay and Lesbian Pride Movement.  They live in Columbia, South Carolina, and both serve as board members for the South Carolina Gay and Lesbian Community Center, now called the Harriet Hancock Community Center.  They were among the first men to file for a marriage license, and ten years after doing so for the first time, they were also among the first men legally married in the state (November 20, 2014).

See also
Ed Madden Collection - Furman University Special Collection

References

External links
http://www.cas.sc.edu/ENGL/faculty/faculty_pages/madden/madden.html
SC Gay and Lesbian Pride Movement
http://www.cas.sc.edu/engl/poetry/general.htm
Rainbow Radio: The REAL Gay Agenda

Year of birth missing (living people)
Living people
American academics of English literature
American activists
American male poets
American gay writers
Harding University alumni
People from Newport, Arkansas
University of South Carolina faculty
University of Texas at Austin College of Liberal Arts alumni
Women's studies academics
Poets from Arkansas
Poets from South Carolina
Place of birth missing (living people)
American LGBT poets
American male non-fiction writers
Gay poets